Syed Asghar Ali Shah Bukhari (c. 1432 – c. 1451), also known as Shah Yaqeeq Baba and Roohani Surgeon, was a Muslim saint from Sindh. Shah Yaqeeq's ‘urs is held in the town of Shah Yaqeeq near Thatta. His Suhrawardi shrine there is regarded as a place of miraculous healing from various ailments.

Further reading

References 

1432 births
1451 deaths
Muslim martyrs